Joseph M. Theisen (February 24, 1877 – December 29, 1946) was an American politician and businessman.

Born in Sheboygan, Wisconsin, Theisen went to Sheboygan Business College. Theisen did office work and worked as an accountant for various businesses in Sheboygan. He also edited a column 'Forty Years Ago' for the Sheboygan Press and was a jailer for the Sheboygan County Sheriff Department. Theisen served on the Sheboygan Library Board and the Sheboygan Common Council. Theisen served in the Wisconsin State Assembly from 1933 to 1939, and 1941 and was a Democrat. Theisen died suddenly at his home in Sheboygan, Wisconsin.

Notes

1877 births
1946 deaths
Politicians from Sheboygan, Wisconsin
Businesspeople from Wisconsin
Journalists from Wisconsin
Wisconsin city council members
Democratic Party members of the Wisconsin State Assembly